KRIV-FM (101.1 FM) is a radio station broadcasting a classic hits format. Licensed to Winona, Minnesota, United States, the station serves the La Crosse, Wisconsin, area.  The station features programming from BBC Radio.

It is owned by Leighton Broadcasting, through licensee Leighton Radio Holdings, Inc., and is located at 752 Bluffview Circle, with its other sister stations, KHWK, KGSL, KWMN, KWNO. The station no longer broadcast in HD radio.

Previous logo

References

External links

Radio stations in Minnesota
Classic hits radio stations in the United States